Nick Fury: Agent of S.H.I.E.L.D. (stylized as Nick Fury: Agent of SHIELD and Nick Fury: Agent of Shield) is a 1998 American television superhero film based on the Marvel Comics character Nick Fury. It was first broadcast  on May 26, 1998 on Fox, intended to be a backdoor pilot for a possible new TV series. Written by David Goyer, and directed by Rod Hardy, the film had a $6 million production budget. It stars David Hasselhoff as Fury, a retired super spy who is approached to return to duty to take down the terrorist organization HYDRA, who threaten to attack Manhattan with a pathogen they have reconstituted known as the Death's Head virus. Lisa Rinna plays Contessa Valentina "Val" Allegra de Fontaine, and Sandra Hess plays Andrea von Strucker / Viper. It was released on DVD on September 30, 2008. The film was met with a largely negative reception.

Plot
Agents of the terrorist organization HYDRA invade a S.H.I.E.L.D. facility, killing Clay Quartermain and reviving a cryogenically preserved Baron Wolfgang Von Strucker. Nick Fury, retired, and living in an abandoned mine shaft in the Yukon, is approached by S.H.I.E.L.D. agents Alexander Goodwin Pierce and Contessa Valentina Allegra De Fontaine to return to duty to take down Hydra, now led by the children of Von Strucker, an old enemy of his. Fury refuses to return until he learns of Quartermain's death. He then accompanies Pierce and De Fontaine to a S.H.I.E.L.D. Helicarrier, where he reunites with old friends Dum Dum Dugan and Gabriel Jones, is introduced to telepath Kate Neville, clashes with new S.H.I.E.L.D. Director General Jack Pincer, and is shown advanced technologies that S.H.I.E.L.D. is developing, including a Life Model Decoy of Fury.

Shown a recording of Quartermain's death, with the killer taunting Fury by name, and informed that the killer was Von Strucker's daughter, codenamed Viper, Fury deduces that Von Strucker's body was taken to harvest a pathogen known as the Death's Head Virus, developed by Arnim Zola to be Hitler's doomsday weapon. Viper calls a meeting of the remaining four Hydra lieutenants from Cairo, Osaka, Prague and London. She executes the London lieutenant for questioning her authority. Fury learns that Zola is still alive and being kept in a S.H.I.E.L.D. safehouse in Berlin, Fury and De Fontaine travel there. They rendezvous with local Interpol agent Gail Runciter, and proceed to the safehouse, where an elderly Zola, in a wheelchair and requiring an oxygen mask, seemingly overpowers Kate Neville's telepathy with his evil visions of destruction. Runciter lures Fury away from the group and shocks him with a device before revealing herself to be Viper in disguise. She then kisses Fury with poisoned lipstick, leaving him unconscious, enabling Hydra to retake Zola. Fury learns he has 48 hours to live unless he can recover a sample of Viper's DNA from which to develop an antidote.

Hydra threatens to attack Manhattan with the virus, barring payment of US $1 billion, and as proof of their threat, the real Gail Runciter is found, dying from the virus. After Fury and his team brief the President of the United States, Pierce determines from a chip from a laptop sold in the Aleutian Islands that the Hydra base might be there. Fury has his people split into two teams, one led by de Fontaine heading to Manhattan to find the refrigerated truck they believe will be needed to deploy the virus, and the other with Fury leading Pierce and Neville to the Aleutian Islands. Upon arriving in the Aleutian Islands, and confirming that a Hydra transmission has come from there, Fury's plane is shot down by heat-seeking missiles. In Manhattan, de Fontaine's team figures out that the refrigerator truck is disguised as a garbage truck, while Fury and his team, having bailed out of the airplane in time, infiltrate the Hydra base.

Fury realizes that it was too easy to get in, just before his team is captured and stripped of their weapons. Viper reveals to him that she will release the virus even if they are paid, and locks Fury and his team in a freezer. Fury reveals that in place of his missing left eye, he keeps an explosive with which they are able to escape. Reaching Viper's control room, Fury and Viper fight until she gets hold of a gun and shoots him. However, it turns out to be Fury's Life Model Decoy. Fury incapacitates Zola and captures Viper, and Neville uses her telepathy to draw the code to abort the detonation from Viper's mind. The Helicarrier arrives, and captures the rest of Hydra's forces, but Viper escapes with the body of her father. Fury decides to return to S.H.I.E.L.D. to counter the new threat of Hydra, while Viper is shown to have restored her father, Baron Wolfgang Von Strucker, to life.

Cast

 David Hasselhoff as SHIELD Agent Colonel Nick Fury
 Lisa Rinna as SHIELD Agent Contessa Valentina 'Val' Allegra De Fontaine
 Sandra Hess as Andrea Von Strucker / Viper
 Neil Roberts as SHIELD Agent Alexander Goodwin Pierce
 Garry Chalk as SHIELD Agent Timothy Aloysius 'Dum-Dum' Dugan
 Tracy Waterhouse as SHIELD Agent Kate Neville
 Tom McBeath as SHIELD Director General Jack Pincer
 Ron Canada as SHIELD Agent Gabriel Jones
 Adrian G. Griffiths as SHIELD Agent Clay Quartermain
 Peter Haworth as Dr. Arnim Zola
 Campbell Lane as Baron Wolfgang Von Strucker
 Scott Heindl as Werner Von Strucker
 Mina E. Mina as HYDRA Cairo Lieutenant
 Stellina Rusich as Inspector Gail Runciter
 Rick Ravanello as SHIELD Agent J. Vaughn
 Roger Cross as SHIELD Agent #1
 Bill Croft as HYDRA Agent Garotte
 Terry David Mulligan as US President

Production
Plans to create a Nick Fury live action production were circulated as early as September 1986, but it was not until mid-May 1995 that Fox Broadcasting announced the acquisition from New World Entertainment of a Nick Fury series pilot, to be broadcast in 1996. The teleplay was written by David S. Goyer several years before the film was made, and Goyer was not otherwise involved as he was working on the television series Sleepwalkers. Despite some misgivings within the studio, the producers cast David Hasselhoff in the lead role "to give SHIELD some recognizable star power". The production also markedly "respected and utilized the comic roots of the project", incorporating "a who's who of the Marvel spy scene" and retaining details such as Fury's eyepatch.

Goyer was not enthusiastic about the casting of David Hasselhoff, but in hindsight said "Hasselhoff turned out to be the best thing in it. He got the joke. The script was meant to be very tongue in cheek and Hasselhoff understood that". Goyer described the film overall as "pretty mediocre". Hasselhoff was reportedly signed for five additional Nick Fury television films, which did not materialize.

Differences from the comics
 In comics, Dugan has red hair, mustache and a bowler hat. None are present in the film.
 Gabe Jones' character was combined with Sidney "The Gaffer" Levine who was the S.H.I.E.L.D. scientist in the comics.
 Kate Neville is an ESPer, unlike in the comics.
 Alexander Pierce is British, whereas, in the comics, he is American.
 Gail Runciter is an agent of Interpol, as opposed to being a S.H.I.E.L.D. agent, like in the comics.
 HYDRA agents appear with black Men in Black-type suits, rather than the green uniform from the comics.
 Andrea's twin brother, Andreas, did not appear, but Andrea did have a younger brother named Werner (in the comics the twins had an older half-brother named Werner).
 Andrea was codenamed "Viper".
 Dr. Arnim Zola appears as an elderly HYDRA chemist responsible for the creation of the Death's Head virus.
 Baron Strucker's body is shown frozen in a chamber; in the final scene of the movie, Baron Strucker is brought back to life.

Reception
Reception to the film was largely negative, with praises for its performances such as that of David Hasselhoff, but criticism for lack of execution and dialogue. In 2016 Neil Calloway called it a "schlocky throwaway TV movie" with "some fantastically tongue in cheek quoteable lines...but in all honesty the film has dated like only a bad TV movie shot in Vancouver in the late 1990s could". ScreenRant later described the film as having "mostly disappeared without a trace with mediocre reviews", and Looper included it on its list of the ten worst Marvel movies. The Encyclopedia of Superheroes on Film and Television found that "the production was hampered by weak, two-dimensional performances that bordered on hysteria and camp", and that Hasselhoff "just did not have the gravitas to pull off the role". Den of Geek described it as "a time filler that doesn't stray too far from Marvel's established SHIELD characters but didn't do anything terribly compelling with them either", concluding that it was "a one night wonder that wasn't very wondrous".

The initial television broadcast of the episode came in fourth in the Nielsen ratings for that time slot, behind reruns on various other networks.

Home media release
Nick Fury: Agent of S.H.I.E.L.D. was released on DVD on September 30, 2008 exclusively at Best Buy stores.

References

External links
 
 
 Nick Fury: Agent of S.H.I.E.L.D. on YouTube's Retro Channel

1998 television films
1998 films
1998 action films
1990s American films
1990s English-language films
1990s spy action films
1990s superhero films
20th Century Fox Television films
Action television films
American spy action films
American superhero films
Films about bioterrorism
Films about terrorism in the United States
Films directed by Rod Hardy
Films scored by Kevin Kiner
Films set in Alaska
Films set in Berlin
Films set in Cairo
Films set in Manhattan
Films set in Yukon
Films shot in British Columbia
Films with screenplays by David S. Goyer
Fox network original films
Live-action films based on Marvel Comics
Nick Fury in other media
Spy television films
Television films as pilots
Television pilots not picked up as a series